Pneumolaelaps is a genus of mites in the family Laelapidae.

Selected species
 Pneumolaelaps arctos (Karg, 1984)     
 Pneumolaelaps asperatus (Berlese, 1904)     
 Pneumolaelaps baywangus Rosario, 1981     
 Pneumolaelaps bombicolens G.Canestrini, 1885  
 Pneumolaelaps breviseta  (Evans & Till, 1966)
 Pneumolaelaps cavitatis (Karg, 1982)     
 Pneumolaelaps eulinguae (Karg, 2003)     
 Pneumolaelaps gigantis (Karg, 1982)     
 Pneumolaelaps hyatti (Evans & Till, 1966)     
 Pneumolaelaps kaibaeus Rosario, 1981     
 Pneumolaelaps karawaiewi (Berlese, 1904)     
 Pneumolaelaps lubricus Voigts & Oudemans, 1904     
 Pneumolaelaps montanus (Berlese, 1904)     
 Pneumolaelaps niutirani Fan & Zhang, 2016

References

Laelapidae